Abdul Halik Hudu (born 19 March 2000), commonly known as Rooney, is a Ghanaian professional footballer who plays as a midfielder for Swedish club AFC Eskilstuna.

Club career

Inter Allies
Halik Hudu started his professional football career with Inter Allies in the Ghana Premier League, getting promoted from their feeder club Accra Youth FC.

During his debut season in 2016, Halik Hudu played 19 games and soon established himself as a starter. At the end of the season, he was crowned "Most Promising Player of the Year" in the Ghanaian Premier League, and also got voted as the "Fans' Player of the Season" at Inter Allies.

In early 2017, Halik Hudu went on a two month-trial with Hammarby IF, appearing in friendlies for the Swedish club. He returned to Inter Allies before the start of the season in March, and went on to win the prize as "Man of the Match" in three league games throughout the year. In total, he made 37 competitive appearances for Inter Allies across two full seasons, scoring twice.

Hammarby IF
In early January 2018, Halik Hudu returned to Hammarby IF for a second trial. On 26 March, a week after his 18th birthday, Halik Hudu completed a permanent transfer to the Allsvenskan club and signed a three and a half year-contract. On 23 August, Halik Hudu scored in his competitive debut for Hammarby, a 3–0 away win against Carlstad United in the Svenska Cupen.

In 2019, Halik Hudu went on a season-long loan to IK Frej in Superettan. He played 26 games and scored twice as the club was relegated from the Swedish second division.

On 28 July 2020, Halik Hudu was loaned out to GIF Sundsvall for the remainder of the season, and also signed a one-year extension of his contract with Hammarby.

On 30 May 2021, Halik Hudu won the 2020–21 Svenska Cupen, the main domestic cup, with Hammarby IF through a 5–4 win on penalties (0–0 after full-time) against BK Häcken in the final.

Lyngby
On 16 July 2021, Halik Hudu signed a two-year contract with Lyngby in the second-tier Danish 1st Division. He made his debut for the club on 30 July as a late substitute for Rasmus Thellufsen in a 2–1 away win over Jammerbugt.

AFC Eskilstuna
On 28 March 2022, Halik Hudu signed a two-year contract with AFC Eskilstuna in Sweden.

International career
Halik Hudu has been capped by the Ghana national under-17 team. He also captained his country in an 8–0 victory against Namibia in March 2016.

In 2018, Halik Hudu was called up to the Ghana national under-20 team ahead of an Africa Cup of Nations qualifier against Algeria on 11 May.

Career statistics

Honours

Club
Hammarby
 Svenska Cupen: 2020–21

Individual
 Most Promising Player of the Year in the Ghanaian Premier League: 2016

References

External links
 

2000 births
Living people
Footballers from Accra
Ghanaian footballers
Ghanaian expatriate footballers
Association football midfielders
International Allies F.C. players
Hammarby Fotboll players
IK Frej players
GIF Sundsvall players
Lyngby Boldklub players
AFC Eskilstuna players
Allsvenskan players
Superettan players
Ettan Fotboll players
Danish 1st Division players
Ghanaian expatriate sportspeople in Sweden
Ghanaian expatriate sportspeople in Denmark
Expatriate footballers in Sweden
Expatriate men's footballers in Denmark